Arbela baibarana is an insect in the Nabidae family. It is found in China (including Fujian).

In eastern China, there is one generation per year.

The larvae feed on various trees, including Casuarina and Acacia species. Larvae can be found from May to December. The species overwinters as a mature larva in a tunnel made in the host plant.

References

Natural History Museum Lepidoptera generic names catalog

Nabidae
Insects of China
Insects described in 1927